Frankenfield Glacier is a small glacier in the northeast part of Noville Peninsula, Thurston Island, in Antarctica. It flows east-northeast to the Bellingshausen Sea between Mount Feury and Mulroy Island. The glacier was first roughly delineated from air photos taken by U.S. Navy Operation Highjump in December 1946, and was named by the Advisory Committee on Antarctic Names for Lieutenant Chester Frankenfield, a meteorologist on the U.S. Navy Bellingshausen Sea Expedition, who established an automated weather station on Thurston Island in February 1960.

See also
 List of glaciers in the Antarctic
 Glaciology

Maps
 Thurston Island – Jones Mountains. 1:500000 Antarctica Sketch Map. US Geological Survey, 1967.
 Antarctic Digital Database (ADD). Scale 1:250000 topographic map of Antarctica. Scientific Committee on Antarctic Research (SCAR). Since 1993, regularly upgraded and updated.

References

 

Glaciers of Thurston Island